Jeffry Wickham (5 August 1933 – 17 June 2014) was an English stage, film and television actor. He served as President of the actors' trade union Equity from 1992 to 1994 and was the father of the actress Saskia Wickham and Rupert Wickham. His death after a long illness was announced on 18 June 2014.

Selected filmography

 You Only Live Twice (1967) - Russian Control Room Officer (uncredited)
 Before Winter Comes (1969) - Captain Roots
 Hello-Goodbye (1970) - Dickie
 The Breaking of Bumbo (1970) - Medical Officer
 Waterloo (1970) - Colborne
 Le silencieux (1973)
 Ransom (1974) - Capt. Frank Barnes
 S*P*Y*S (1974) - Seely
 The Sweeney (1975) (Episode: "Faces") - The Major
 Thriller (1975) (Episode: "Night is the Time for Killing") - Parker
 Smuga cienia (1976)
 Memed My Hawk (1984) - Captain Faruk
 Another Country (1984) - Arthur
 Plenty (1985) - 1st SOE Man 
 Clockwise (1986) - Headmaster #10
 A Man Called Sarge (1990) - Fitzpatrick
 The Remains of the Day (1993) - Viscount Bigge
 The Grotesque (1995) - Justice Congreve 
 Marco Polo: Haperek Ha'aharon (1996)
 Ali G Indahouse (2002) - Speaker
 Vera Drake (2004) - Prosecution Barrister
 Brothers of the Head (2005) - Sir Allardyce Stevens
 Space Race (2005) - Nikolai Kuznetsov
 Scoop (2006) - Sid's Co-Passengers

References

External links

1933 births
2014 deaths
English male stage actors
English male film actors
English male television actors
Place of death missing
Place of birth missing
English trade unionists
20th-century English male actors
21st-century English male actors